Embassy of Ukraine in Tallinn is the diplomatic mission of Ukraine in Estonia.

History 
Following independence, Ukraine August 24, 1991 Estonia proclaimed Ukraine December 6, 1991. January 3, 1992 between Ukraine and Estonia was established diplomatic relations. The basis for future bilateral relations was signed on 26 May 1992 Treaty of Friendship and Cooperation between Ukraine and Estonia. October 1, 1993 in Tallinn started the Embassy of Ukraine in Estonia.

Previous Ambassadors
 Volodymyr Kedrovskiy (1919-1921)
 Mikhaylo Parashchuk (1921)
 Evgen Golitsynskii (1921)
 Evgen Terletsky (1921-1923)
 Viktor Hladush (1992-1993)
 Yuriy Olenenko (1993-1999)
 Mykola Makarevich (1999-2005)
 Pavlo Kiriakov (2005-2010)
 Volodymyr Reshetnyak (2010), chargé d'Affaires ad interim
 Viktor Kryzhanivsky (2010-2017)
 Vasyl Yakovenko (2017-2018), chargé d'Affaires ad interim
 Mariana Betsa (2018-)

See also 
 Ukraine–Estonia relations
 Foreign relations of Estonia
 Foreign relations of Ukraine
 Embassy of Estonia in Kiev
 Diplomatic missions of Ukraine

References

External links 
 Embassy of Ukraine in Tallinn
 The legal basis of relations between Ukraine and the Republic of Estonia

Tallinn
Ukraine
Estonia–Ukraine relations